This is a list of wars and armed conflicts in and involving Russia and its predecessors in chronological order, from the 9th to the 21st century.

The Russian military and troops of its predecessor states in Russia took part in a large number of wars and armed clashes in various parts of the world: starting from the princely squads, opposing the raids of nomads, and fighting for the expansion of the territory of Kievan Rus'. Following the disintegration of Kievan Rus', the emergence of the Grand Duchy of Moscow and then the centralized Russian state saw a period of significant territorial growth of the state centred in Moscow and then St. Petersburg during the 15th to 20th centuries, marked by wars of conquest in Eastern Europe, the Caucasus, the Volga region, Siberia, Central Asia and the Far East, the world wars of the early 20th century, the proxy wars of the Cold War, and today.

The list includes:

 external wars
 foreign intervention in domestic conflicts
 anti-colonial uprisings of the peoples conquered during the Russian expansion
 princely feuds
 peasant uprisings
 revolutions

Legends of results:

Kievan Rus'

Grand Duchy of Moscow (1263–1547)

Tsardom of Russia (1547–1721)

Russian Empire (1721–1917)

Russian Republic (1917)

Russian SFSR (1917–1922)

Russia and the Soviet Union (1916–1934)

Soviet Union (1922–1991)

Russian Federation (1991–present)

See also 

 
 
 
  
 List of wars involving Armenia
 List of wars involving Azerbaijan
 List of wars involving Belarus
 List of wars involving Estonia
 List of wars involving Finland
 List of wars involving Georgia (country)
 List of wars involving Kazakhstan
 List of wars involving Kyrgyzstan
 List of wars involving Latvia
 List of wars involving Lithuania
 List of wars involving Moldova
 List of wars involving Poland
 List of wars involving Tajikistan
 List of wars involving Turkey
 List of wars involving Ukraine
 List of wars involving Uzbekistan

Notes

References 

 
 
Russia

Russia history-related lists
Russian and Soviet military-related lists